Psorotichia is a genus of lichen-forming fungi in the family Lichinaceae. The genus was circumscribed by Italian lichenologist Abramo Bartolommeo Massalongo in 1855, with Psorotichia murorum assigned as the type species.

Species
Psorotichia diffundens 
Psorotichia gyelnikii 
Psorotichia murorum 
Psorotichia polyspora 
Psorotichia pyrenopsoides 
Psorotichia schaereri

References

Lichinomycetes
Lichen genera
Ascomycota genera
Taxa described in 1855
Taxa named by Abramo Bartolommeo Massalongo